This is a list of calligraphers.

Calligraphers 

 Reza Abbasi
 Aizu Yaichi 
 Arthur Baker
 Pat Blair
 Timothy Botts
 Cai Yong 
 Ralph Waddell Douglass
 Hattat Aziz Efendi
 Karl-Erik Forsberg
 Tim Gaze
 Richard Gething
 Jenny Hunter Groat
 Mi Guangjiang
 Robert Haas
 Han Seok-bong 
 Mir Emad Hassani
 Karlgeorg Hoefer
 Huang Tingjian 
 Ingen Ryuki 
 Thomas Ingmire
 Shinjō Itō 
 Donald Jackson
 Jang Il-soon
 Jiang Kui 
 Steve Jobs
 Edward Johnston
 Kim Eung-heon 
 Aslam Kiratpuri
 Rudolf Koch
 Liu Gongquan 
 Louis Madarasz
 Hassan Massoudy
 Mi Fu
 Arnold Möller
 Ono no Michikaze
 Brody Neuenschwander
 Konoe Nobutada
 Ouyang Xun 
 Mishkín-Qalam
 Qu Leilei 
 Jalil Rasouli
 Satyajit Ray
 Lloyd J. Reynolds
 Onoe Saishu
 Luigi Serafini
 Shen Yinmo 
 Platt Rogers Spencer
 Sun Guoting 
 Soraya Syed
 Christophe Szpajdel
 Mir Ali Tabrizi
 Shingai Tanaka
 Oona Tully
 Wang Xianzhi 
 Wang Xizhi 
 Osman Waqialla
 Sheila Waters
 Wei Shuo 
 Hermann Zapf
 Yan Zhenqing 
 Zhang Xu 
 Zhao Mengfu 
 Zhong Hui

See also

 List of lists of artists by nationality

Calligraphers
Calligraphers